The  is a single-car hybrid diesel multiple unit (DMU) train type operated by East Japan Railway Company (JR East) on the Koumi Line in Japan. Three cars were delivered in April 2007, entering revenue service from 31 July 2007.

The body design is based on the earlier KiHa E130 series DMUs, but with two single doors per side instead of three pairs of doors.

The cars incorporate hybrid diesel/battery technology developed on the earlier "NE Train" experimental hybrid car, and were intended to operate for a period of two years on the Koumi Line to evaluate the viability for full-scale fleet operation.

Two cars are normally used together on  services on the line.

Hybrid operation cycle
On starting from standstill, energy stored in lithium-ion batteries is used to drive the motors, with the engine cut out. The engine then cuts in for further acceleration and running on gradients. When running down gradients, the motor acts as a generator, recharging the batteries. The engine is also used for braking.

Interior
The passenger saloons are arranged with 1+2 abreast transverse seating and longitudinal bench seating at the car ends. Each car includes a wheelchair-compatible toilet.

References

External links

 JR East KiHa E200 Information 
 JR East KiHa E200 (Japan Railfan Magazine) 

East Japan Railway Company
Train-related introductions in 2007
Hybrid multiple units of Japan